A narrative environment is a space, whether physical or virtual, in which stories can unfold.  A virtual narrative environment might be the narrative framework in which game play can proceed. A physical narrative environment might be an exhibition area within a museum, or a foyer of a retail space, or the public spaces around a building - anywhere in short where stories can be told in space. It is also a term coined by the Central Saint Martin's College of Art and Design programme where the first Narrative Environment course was introduced in 2003. It is a full-time, 2 year Masters level course leading to an MA degree.  Originally called in Creative Practice for Narrative Environments, now M.A. for Narrative Environments.

External links
A course at Central Saint Martin's College of Art and Design
Narrative Environments - Interdisciplinary Research Institute specialised on Narrative Environments
Narrative Ecology A practical methodology developed to utilise narrative when creating, designing or conceptualising narrative environments.

Further reading

Narratology